Alexander of Trichonium in Aetolia was an ancient Greek commander of the Aetolians in 218 and 219 BC.  With about three thousand troops he attacked the rear guard (consisting of mercenaries and Acarnanians) of the army of Philip V of Macedon on his return from Thermus, but the attempt was unsuccessful, and many Aetolians were killed in the battle, which ended with the Aetolians being completely routed by Philip's forces.

References

Ancient Greek generals
3rd-century BC Greek people
Ancient Aetolians
219 BC deaths